Chylomicrons (from the Greek χυλός, chylos, meaning juice (of plants or animals), and micron, meaning small particle), also known as ultra low-density lipoproteins (ULDL), are lipoprotein particles that consist of triglycerides (85–92%), phospholipids (6–12%), cholesterol (1–3%), and proteins (1–2%). They transport dietary lipids from the intestines to other locations in the body. ULDLs are one of the five major groups of lipoproteins (sorted by density) that enable fats and cholesterol to move within the water-based solution of the bloodstream. A protein specific to chylomicrons is ApoB48.

There is an inverse relationship in the density and size of lipoprotein particles: fats have a lower density than water or smaller protein molecules, and the larger particles have a higher ratio of internal fat molecules with respect to the outer emulsifying protein molecules in the shell. ULDLs, if in the region of 1,000 nm or more, are the only lipoprotein particles that can be seen using a light microscope, at maximum magnification. All the other classes are submicroscopic.

Function

Chylomicrons transport lipids absorbed from the intestine to adipose, cardiac, and skeletal muscle tissue, where their triglyceride components are hydrolyzed by the activity of the lipoprotein lipase, allowing the released free fatty acids to be absorbed by the tissues. When a large portion of the triglyceride core has been hydrolyzed, chylomicron remnants are formed and are taken up by the liver, thereby also transferring dietary fat to the liver.

Origin
Pancreatic lipases digest dietary triglycerides in the lumen of the small intestine, forming monoglycerides and fatty acids. These lipids are absorbed into enterocytes via passive diffusion. Inside the cell, these lipids are transported to the smooth endoplasmic reticulum, where they are re-esterified to form triglycerides. These triglycerides, along with phospholipids and cholesterol, are added to apolipoprotein B48 to form immature chylomicrons. Immature chylomicrons are transported from the smooth ER to the Golgi apparatus via SAR1B proteins, where they are processed, resulting in mature chylomicrons.

Mature chylomicrons are secreted through the basolateral membrane into the lacteals, where they join lymph to become chyle. The lymphatic vessels carry the chyle to the lymphatic ducts before they join the venous return of the systemic circulation via subclavian veins. From there, the chylomicrons supply the tissue with fat absorbed from the diet. It is important to note that, unlike digested carbohydrates (in the form of monosaccharides) and proteins (in the form of amino acids), digested lipids (in the form of chylomicrons) bypass the hepatic portal system, avoiding first pass metabolism.

Stages
The three stages of the chylomicron are nascent, mature, and remnant.

Nascent chylomicrons
Triglycerides are emulsified by bile and hydrolyzed by the enzyme lipase, resulting in a mixture of fatty acids and monoglycerides. These then pass from the intestinal lumen into the enterocyte, where they are re-esterified to form triglycerides. The triglycerides are then combined with phospholipids, cholesteryl esters, and apolipoprotein B48 (ApoB48) to form a nascent chylomicron. These are then released by exocytosis from the enterocytes into the lacteals, lymphatic vessels originating in the villi of the small intestine, and are then secreted into the bloodstream at the thoracic duct's connection with the left subclavian vein.

Nascent chylomicrons are composed primarily of triglycerides (85%) and contain some cholesterol and cholesteryl esters. The main apolipoprotein component is ApoB48.

Mature chylomicron
While circulating in blood, chylomicrons exchange components with high-density lipoproteins (HDL). The HDL donates apolipoprotein C-II (APOC2) and apolipoprotein E (APOE) to the nascent chylomicron and, thus, converts it to a mature chylomicron (often referred to simply as "chylomicron"). APOC2 is the coenzyme for lipoprotein lipase (LPL) activity.

Chylomicron remnant
Once triglyceride stores are distributed, the chylomicron returns APOC2 to the HDL (but keeps APOE), and, thus, becomes a chylomicron remnant, now only 30–50 nm. ApoB48 and APOE are important to identify the chylomicron remnant in the liver for endocytosis and breakdown.

Pathology 
There are some disorders in which chylomicrons are involved.

Hyperchylomicronemia 
The hyperchylomicronemia syndrome is a disorder characterized by extreme hypertriglyceridemia, the presence of chylomicrons, and one or more of the following clinical manifestations: eruptive xanthomas, lipaemia retinalis, hepatosplenomegaly, recurrent abdominal pain, and/ or acute pancreatitis.

Hypochylomicronemia 
Hypochylomicronemia is defined as the low level or absence of postprandial CMs, and it can result from genetic or acquired causes.

Chylomicron remnants and cardiovascular disease 
Postprandial hyperlipidemia is considered an important risk factor for cardiovascular disease.

References

Lipoproteins